Wasana is a 1976 Sinhalese language romance film directed by K.A.W. Perera. The film stars Geetha Kumarasinghe, Vijaya Kumaranatunga and Malini Fonseka made notable roles. Also this film was the cinema debut of popular Sri Lankan film actress Geetha Kumarasinghe.

The film follows the lives of middle-class people in Sri Lanka.

Plot

Cast
 Vijaya Kumaratunga as Sudam
 Malini Fonseka as Sudarshi Rajadasa
 Joe Abeywickrama as Sudam's friend
 Nita Fernando as Sudam's sister
 Dommie Jayawardena as Newton
 Geetha Kumarasinghe as Pushpa
 Herbert Amarawickrama as CID Inspector Ronald Wickrama
 B. S. Perera as Dobie 'Sima'
 Herbie Seneviratne as Mr. Rajadasa
 Freddie Silva as Martin
 Rukmani Devi as Mrs. Rajadasa
 Lilian Edirisinghe as Nona
 Sudesh Gunaratne as Sudarshi's courter
 Pujitha Mendis as Orderly
 Wimala Kumari as Mrs. Fernando
 J. H. Stanley Perera as Tractor driver
 Seetha Kumari as Nurse
 D. Gunapala as Mudalali's man

References

External links
National Film Corporation of Sri Lanka - Official Website
Official Website of Geetha Kumarasinghe

1976 films
1970s Sinhala-language films